The 1931 Louisville Cardinals football team was an American football team that represented the University of Louisville as a member of the Southern Intercollegiate Athletic Association (SIAA) during the 1931 college football season. In their first and only season under head coach Jack McGrath, the Cardinals compiled a 0–8 record. 

Schedule

References

Louisville
Louisville Cardinals football seasons
Louisville Cardinals football